Jahadi White (born February 19, 1976) is an American former professional basketball player who played in the NBA.

Basketball career
Jahidi White attended high school at Cardinal Ritter College Prep. While at Ritter, White teamed with future Duke University player Chris Carrawell, and ex-NBA player Loren Woods. He subsequently attended and played basketball at Georgetown University, where he played with Allen Iverson and Othella Harrington, two other future NBA players. He was drafted in 1998 in the 2nd round (43rd overall) by the Washington Wizards.

In 2003, Washington traded White to the Phoenix Suns for Brevin Knight and, in the following season, he was selected by the Charlotte Bobcats in the expansion draft, and waived in February 2005. He was signed for 2006-2007 by the Cleveland Cavaliers, but was released during preseason. Injuries limited his playing time and mobility. During his career, he averaged 5.9 PPG, 1.1 BPG, 0.2 APG and 5.8 RPG.

Acting career
In 2007, White appeared in the Sci Fi Channel original movie Alien vs. Alien, aka Showdown at Area 51, playing a hulking alien warrior intent on destroying all life on Earth. He had no spoken lines in this film.

Nelly mentioned him at the end of his hit song St. Louie.
Nelly also mentioned him in the St. Lunatics song "Who's the Boss" saying the Like "In the Center Like Jahidi" metaphorically referencing the position Jahidi played in basketball.

References

External links
NBA.com profile

1976 births
Living people
Basketball players from St. Louis
Centers (basketball)
Charlotte Bobcats expansion draft picks
Charlotte Bobcats players
Georgetown Hoyas men's basketball players
Parade High School All-Americans (boys' basketball)
Phoenix Suns players
Power forwards (basketball)
Washington Wizards draft picks
Washington Wizards players
American men's basketball players